This is the list of Universiade records in athletics.

Men

Women

Records in defunct events

Men's events

Women's events

See also
List of Universiade records in swimming

References

Universiade
Athletics at the Summer Universiade
Athletics